Coda is the sixth studio album by SMP, released on November 2, 2010 by Music Ration Entertainment.

Reception
Trubie Turner of ReGen gave Death of the Format a mostly positive review, saying "from the start, this definitely feels like a rejuvenated SMP, presenting a somewhat stripped down but purer blend of coldwave, industrial, hip-hop, and punk in that unmistakable style." Despite moderate criticism of the runtime, Turner concluded that the album is "full of attitude, intelligent biting lyrics, and infectious hip-hop inspired rhythm."

Track listing

Personnel
Adapted from the Coda liner notes.

SMP
 Jason Bazinet – lead vocals, programming, drums (1, 6)

Additional performers
 Chris Demarcus – guitar and additional vocals (2)
 Juan Gomez – drums (2-5, 7)
 J. Ned Kirby – vocals (2)
 Dee Madden – vocals (2)
 Dan Miura – guitar (3-7)
 Michael Ostrander – programming, production and mixing (8)
 Rob Seaverns – guitar (1)
 Sam Wilder – bass guitar (6)

Production and design
 Wade Alin – production and mixing (1-7)
 Garrick Antikajian – cover art, illustrations, design
 Bryce Francis – recording

Release history

References

External links 
 Coda at Discogs (list of releases)

2010 albums
SMP (band) albums
Albums produced by Wade Alin